The Mrs. Henry F. Akin House is a historic house at 901 S. 8th Avenue in Maywood, Illinois. The house was built circa 1910 for Elizabeth R. Akin, the wife of former Maywood mayor Henry F. Akin. Tallmadge and Watson, Chicago-area architects who were pioneers of the Prairie School style, designed the home. The one-story bungalow features a stucco exterior, wood banding which forms geometric shapes, casement windows, and overhanging eaves, all typical elements of early Prairie works. The house is one of three in Maywood designed by prominent Prairie School architects and the only bungalow of the three.

The house was added to the National Register of Historic Places on May 22, 1992.

References

Houses on the National Register of Historic Places in Cook County, Illinois
Prairie School architecture in Illinois
Maywood, Illinois